The Orion is the student newspaper of California State University, Chico and produces 32 issues every year, 16 each semester. Its offices are in the basement of Plumas Hall on the Chico State campus. It has won numerous state and national awards, including several National Pacemakers. Its name is taken from the constellation Orion, as the newspaper is meant to be a "hunter of truth."

History 

The Orion's first issue was published March 12, 1975. The offices were in the basement of Meriam Library. The newspaper was eight pages long and in tabloid format. There was another student paper on campus, The Wildcat, which was funded by the Associated Students.

Because of frequent conflicts, The Wildcat removed itself from the campus in 1977, leaving The Orion as Chico State's only student newspaper. Today, The Wildcat is known as the Chico News & Review.

The Orion moved from the Meriam Library basement to the Plumas Hall basement in the mid-1980s. The Orion won its first National Newspaper Pacemaker Award in 1989.

Operation 

The Orion is published every Wednesday of the semester, except for fall semester finals week. During finals week of spring semester, a special summer issue is produced. Each issue was broadsheet format until 2015 and changed to tabloid format. The paper is divided into news, opinion, calendar, arts and sports sections.

The Orion has separate staffs for editorial content, business/advertising, and design. Editorial content (and the paper overall) is headed by the editor in chief and the managing editor, business and advertising is headed by the business manager, and design is headed by the art director.

In editorial content, there are four specific departments, covering different types of events: news, opinion, sports and features.  Each section is headed by an editor, who oversees a staff of reporters. Editors choose one of the reporters to be an assistant editor. There are also three more departments: copy proofreads and copy edits stories, photo produces picture to be included with the stories and online produces content in conjunction with the other departments for production on the newspaper's Web site.

Design is divided into two departments: editorial and advertising. These departments are headed by a design manager. Editorial design helps layout and creates graphics for editorial content, while advertising design designs advertisements for the paper that are sold by the business staff. Advertising design is also assigned a member of the copy department who proofreads ads.

The business department oversees the financial aspects of the paper, selling and placing advertisements, handling costs, and helping the paper stay in budget.

Awards 

Numerous state and national awards have been won by The Orion over the years. A partial list includes:

Associated Collegiate Press National Newspaper Pacemaker Award: 1988–89, 1992–93, 1994–95, 1995–96, 1996–97, 1998–99, 2002–03, 2003–04, 2004–05, 2009.
Associated Collegiate Press National Newspaper of the Year: 1998, 1999, 2001, 2002, 2003.
Associated Collegiate Press National Convention Best of Show: 2004, 2005, 2008, 2009, 2012.
California Newspaper Publishers Association Best University Newspaper: 1994, 1995, 1996, 1997, 1998, 1999, 2000, 2001, 2004, 2008.
Society of Professional Journalists Mark of Excellence Award National Winner: 2000, 2004.

On October 29, 2005, The Orion was inducted into the Associated Collegiate Press Hall of Fame.

External links
Official Site

Student newspapers published in California
Mass media in Chico, California
California State University, Chico